James Frederick Skinner (11 October 1898 – September 1984) was an English professional footballer who played for Beckenham and Tottenham Hotspur.

Early life 
Skinner was born in Beckenham. He attended Manor Road school in West Ham and went to play for West Ham schools and represented the London schools side of 1912–13. In 1913 the schoolboy star was chosen to play for England schoolboys.

Football career 
Skinner began his career at Beckenham before joining Tottenham Hotspur in 1919 the wing half made his debut against Clapton Orient on 11 October 1919 his 21st birthday. In a career that was cut short by injury he made a total of 95 appearances and scored on three occasions in all competitions for the Spurs.

Post-football career 
Skinner ran several businesses including a  drapery shop in Ladbroke Grove, a grocers located in Enfield before running a building company in Harlow and later a fruit farm.

Death 
Skinner died in September, 1984 at Cranborne, Dorset.

References 

1898 births
1984 deaths
Footballers from Beckenham
English footballers
English Football League players
Tottenham Hotspur F.C. players
Beckenham Town F.C. players
Association football wing halves